The Catalan dialects feature a relative uniformity, especially when compared to other Romance languages; both in terms of vocabulary, semantics, syntax, morphology, and phonology. Mutual intelligibility between its dialects is very high, estimates ranging from 90% to 95%. The only exception is the isolated idiosyncratic Alguerese dialect.

Overview
In 1861, linguist Manuel Milà i Fontanals split Catalan into two main dialects: Western and Eastern. There are a few other differences in pronunciation, verbal morphology, and vocabulary.
Western Catalan comprises the two dialects of Northwestern Catalan and Valencian; the Eastern block comprises three to four dialects (depending on their classification): Central, Roussillonese (Northern Catalan), and Insular (Balearic and Alguerese). Each dialect can be further subdivided into several subdialects.

There are two spoken standards for the language based on the Eastern and Western dialects respectively:
 In Catalonia, the Institut d'Estudis Catalans (IEC) regulates the spoken standard based on Central Catalan, which has the highest number of speakers and is spoken in the densely populated regions of the Barcelona province, the eastern half of the province of Tarragona, and most of the province of Girona.
 In the Valencian Community, the Acadèmia Valenciana de la Llengua adapts the Fabran guidelines to the Valencian variety, and regulates an alternative spoken standard based on the Southern Valencian subdialect. Despite having fewer speakers than the Central Valencian subdialect, Southern Valencian has been less influenced by Spanish. It is spoken in the South and North of the Valencia and Alicante provinces respectively, in cities such as Gandia, Alcoi and Xàtiva.
Valencians are only surpassed in number of Catalan-speakers by Catalans themselves, representing approximately a third of the whole Catalan-speaking population. Therefore, in the context of linguistic conflict, recognition and respect towards the dual standard, as well as the dual Catalan–Valencian denomination, pacifies the tense central–periphery relations between Catalonia and the Valencian community.

Pronunciation

Vowels
Catalan has inherited the typical vowel system of Vulgar Latin, with seven stressed phonemes: , a common feature in Western Romance, except Spanish, Asturian, and Aragonese. Balearic has also instances of stressed . Dialects differ in the different degrees of vowel reduction, and the incidence of the pair .

In Eastern Catalan (except Majorcan), unstressed vowels reduce to three: ; ;  remains distinct. There are a few instances of unreduced ,  in some words.

In Western Catalan, unstressed vowels reduce to five: ; ;  remain distinct. This reduction pattern, inherited from Proto-Romance, is also found in Italian and Portuguese. Some Western dialects present further reduction or vowel harmony in some cases.

Morphology
For example,  (Central),  (Balearic),  (Northern), ('I speak').

In verbs, the inchoative desinences are /, .

Vocabulary
Despite its relative lexical unity, the two dialectal blocks of Catalan (Eastern and Western) show some differences in word choices. Any lexical divergence within any of the two groups can be explained as an archaism. Also, usually Central Catalan acts as an innovative element.

Insular Catalan
Insular Catalan may refer to:

the Balearic subdialects, mainly spoken on the islands of Ibiza, Majorca and Minorca.
Algherese, the Catalan variety spoken in the Sardinian city of Alghero.

Continental Catalan
Continental Catalan may refer to:
Northern–Eastern Catalan, Central–Eastern Catalan and Northwestern Catalan, all spoken in mainland Catalonia, as opposed to Insular Catalan (mainly Balearic Catalan)

References

Bibliography
 
  
 
 
 
 
 
 

 
Catalan language